The Nio ES7 (or Nio EL7 for Europe) is a battery-powered, 5-seat mid-size luxury SUV manufactured by Chinese electric car company Nio. The ES7 was announced online in June 2022, and is the first to use Nio’s NT 2.0 Platform. It was put into production in 2022 for the Chinese and European market.

Specifications 

The ES7 is powered by a lithium-ion battery pack, a package that is also swappable just like the Nio ES8.

The ES7 is a 5-seater mid-size production SUV, with a wheelbase of 2,960 mm and a body length of 4,912 mm. The body and chassis are completely aluminum, and the drivetrain is all-wheel drive standard, and featured active air suspension as standard across all models. Drag coefficient as low as 0.263. 

The Nio ES7 is equipped with both permanent magnet and induction motors. With a dual-motor four-wheel drive system with the front motor offering a peak output of 180 kW and the rear motor offering a peak output of 300 kW, the Nio ES7 accelerates from 0 to 100 km/h in 3.9 seconds and 100 to 0km/h braking is within 33.9 meters. The ES7 is powered by a lithium-ion battery pack, a package that is also swappable just like the Nio ES8. The range of the car with the 75 kWh Standard Range Battery is 485 km (301 miles), while the models equipped with the 150 kWh Ultralong Range Battery has a range of 930 km (578 miles) CLTC. 

the ES7 is one of the first certified passenger vehicles in China with the ability to tow a caravan or a trailer with a license. The electric tow bar is an optional add-on for the ES7 and has a maximum towing capacity of 2,000 kg (4,440 lb). The ES7 can also support vehicle to load (V2L) discharging and “Camping Mode” to power outside devices. 

The price of the ES7 ranges from ￥468,000 ($69,300 | €67,850) to ￥548,000 ($81,100 | €79,450)

References 

ES7
Cars introduced in 2022
Production electric cars
Crossover sport utility vehicles